William Brougham, 2nd Baron Brougham and Vaux  (26 September 1795 – 3 January 1886), known as William Brougham until 1868, was a British barrister and Whig politician.

Background and education
Brougham was the youngest son of Henry Brougham and Eleanor Syme, daughter of the Reverend James Syme. Lord Chancellor Henry Brougham, 1st Baron Brougham and Vaux, was his elder brother. He was educated at Edinburgh High School and Jesus College, Cambridge, and was called to the Bar, Lincoln's Inn, in 1823.

Career
Brougham was appointed a Master in Chancery in 1831, which he remained until the following year. In 1831 he was also returned to Parliament for Southwark, a seat he held until 1835. He was also lieutenant-colonel in the Cumberland Volunteers and served as a Deputy Lieutenant and Justice of the Peace for Cumberland. In 1868 he succeeded his elder brother as second Baron Brougham and Vaux according to a special remainder in the letters patent, and was able to take a seat in the House of Lords.

Family
Lord Brougham and Vaux married Emily Frances, daughter of Sir Charles William Taylor, 1st Baronet, in 1834. They had three sons and three daughters. She died in April 1884. Lord Brougham and Vaux survived her by two years and died in January, 1886, aged 90, at Brougham Hall, a gothic revival mansion, the building of which was largely overseen by William before he succeeded Henry as Baron Brougham. He was succeeded in the barony by his eldest son, Henry.

Arms

References

External links 
 

2
Alumni of Jesus College, Cambridge
Members of Lincoln's Inn
Deputy Lieutenants of Cumberland
Members of the Parliament of the United Kingdom for English constituencies
UK MPs 1831–1832
UK MPs 1832–1835
UK MPs who inherited peerages
1795 births
1886 deaths